"Love Bomb" is a song and title track from the album Love Bomb by Lynsey de Paul, written by de Paul and Barry Blue. It is listed in the Catalog of Copyright Entries held by the Library of Congress 1976. The song's lyrics is a call for love and peace. with yearning strings, pulsing beat and bass that propel this soulful song along until the inevitable exploding bomb sound effect, after which Lynsey's vocals go ever higher, "reaching for the stars above."

As a single, it was released on the Mercury Records label in the United States and by Jet Records in the UK. In some European countries, it was released by Polydor Records. The recording also featured on the dance compilation album, Special-Discotheque Club Privé – N°3. De Paul's single version most recently appeared as a track on her double CD anthology, Into My Music. The Record Mirror & Disc gave the single a positive review stating "a thumping chorus and explosion... scarcely what you would expect from Lynsey".

The song has been covered by U.S. soul singer Cheryl Lynn, English Celtic rock band the Dolmen, German band the Cherry Chords, and, on 28 May 2020, Dornbirn 78 released a CD single with four versions of the song, that received favourable reviews such as "This is a brilliant slice of club electronica, packed with effortless cool. From the pulsing bassline to the vocal stabs every slice of  DNA is designed to move the dancefloor". The Dornbirn 78 versions were championed by "Special Requests", a promoter of cutting-edge electronic music.

References

1975 songs
Lynsey de Paul songs
Songs written by Lynsey de Paul
Songs written by Barry Blue
Jet Records singles